Dating Games People Play is a 2005 American drama film directed by Stefan Marc, starring Austin Peck and Leslie Bega.

Cast
 Austin Peck as Nick Jenkins
 Leslie Bega as Mona Evans
 Stefan Marc as Jed Rollins
 Stephanie Brown as Robin Jaeger
 Clay Rivers as Vinnie
 Tamie Sheffield as Tiffany

Release
The film premiered at the Newport Beach Film Festival on 20 April 2005.

Reception
Don Houston of DVD Talk rated the film 3.5 stars out of 5 and called it a "witty little romantic comedy".

Craig Outhier of The Orange County Register called it a "cumbersome, aimless piece of low-browery".

Mark Olsen of the Los Angeles Times called the film "entirely unnecessary" and a "generic and uninvolving portrayal of life in Newport Beach".

References

External links
 
 

American drama films
2005 drama films